Victor Massé (born Félix-Marie Massé; 7 March 1822 – 5 July 1884) was a French composer.

Biography
Massé was born in Lorient (Morbihan) and studied at the Paris Conservatoire, winning the Prix de Rome in 1844 for his cantata Le Rénégat de Tanger before turning his attention to opera. While at the Conservatoire, Massé studied with Jaques Halévy. He wrote some twenty operas, including La Chanteuse voilée (1850), followed by the more ambitious Galathée (1852) and Paul et Virginie (1876). His best-known and most successful work was the opéra comique Les Noces de Jeannette (1853). His last work, Une Nuit de Cléopâtre, was performed posthumously in April 1885.

Massé died in Paris and is buried in Montmartre Cemetery.  in the 9th arrondissement of Paris is named after him.

Operas
 La Chambre gothique, opéra (1849)
 La Chanteuse voilée (1850, text by Eugène Scribe and Adolphe de Leuven)
 Galathée (1852, text by Jules Barbier and Michel Carré))
 Les Noces de Jeannette, opéra comique (1853, text by J. Barbier and M. Carré)
 La Fiancée du diable (1854, text by Eugène Scribe and H. Romand)
 Miss Fauvette (1855, text by J. Barbier and M. Carré)
 Les Saisons (1855, text by J. Barbier and M. Carré)
 La Reine Topaze (1856, text by Lockroy and Battu)
 Les Chaises à porteurs (1858, text by Dumanoir and Clairville)
 La Fée Carabosse (1859, text by Lockroy and Frères Cogniard)
 La Mule de Pedro (1863, text by Dumanoir)
 Fior d'Aliza (1866, after Lamartine)
 Le Fils du brigadier (1867, text by Eugène Labiche and Delacour)
 Paul and Virginie (1876, text by J. Barbier and M. Carré)
 Une Nuit de Cléopâtre (1885, text by J. Barbier)

See also
The works of Antonin Mercié

References
 Volker Dehs: "Jules Verne entre Léo Delibes, Halévy et Victor Massé", in Revue Jules Verne, no. 24: Jules Verne et la musique (2007), p. 97–102.

1822 births
1884 deaths
19th-century classical composers
19th-century French composers
19th-century French male musicians
Academic staff of the Conservatoire de Paris
Burials at Montmartre Cemetery
Conservatoire de Paris alumni
French male classical composers
French opera composers
French operetta composers
French Romantic composers
Male opera composers
Musicians from Lorient
Prix de Rome for composition